Kani Vrana(1913–1984) was a Turkish judge. He was president of the Constitutional Court of Turkey from 1 October 1975 until 13 July 1978. He was also president of the High Electoral Council between 1963 and 1970. He was born in Skopje, North Macedonia on July 13, 1913 and died on June 17 1984.

References

External links
Web-site of the Constitutional Court of Turkey 

Turkish judges
Turkish civil servants
1913 births
1984 deaths
Presidents of the Constitutional Court of Turkey
Burials at Cebeci Asri Cemetery
Istanbul University Faculty of Law alumni